Saathiya may refer to:

 Saathiya (film), a 2002 Bollywood film
 Saath Nibhaana Saathiya, a television series currently broadcasting on STAR Plus channel
 Saathiya – Pyar Ka Naya Ehsaas, a drama-series on the Indian satellite television network Sahara One in 2004